Alignments of random points in a plane refers to the study of the relative positions of point that are randomly placed in a planar region. For example, how closely can we expect to find three points lying on a straight line?
Studies have shown that such near-alignments occur by chance with greater frequency than one might intuitively expect.  This has been put forward as a demonstration that ley lines and other similar mysterious alignments believed by some to be phenomena of deep significance might exist solely due to chance alone, as opposed to the supernatural or anthropological explanations put forward by their proponents. The topic has also been studied in the fields of computer vision and astronomy.

A number of studies have examined the mathematics of alignment of random points on the plane. In all of these, the width of the line — the allowed displacement of the positions of the points from a perfect straight line — is important. It allows the fact that real-world features are not mathematical points, and that their positions need not line up exactly for them to be considered in alignment. Alfred Watkins, in his classic work on ley lines The Old Straight Track, used the width of a pencil line on a map as the threshold for the tolerance of what might be regarded as an alignment. For example, using a 1 mm pencil line to draw alignments on a 1:50,000 scale Ordnance Survey map, the corresponding width on the ground would be 50 m.

Estimate of probability of chance alignments 
Contrary to intuition, finding alignments between randomly placed points on a landscape gets progressively easier as the geographic area to be considered increases. One way of understanding this phenomenon is to see that the increase in the number of possible combinations of sets of points in that area overwhelms the decrease in the probability that any given set of points in that area line up.

One definition which expresses the generally accepted meaning of "alignment" is:
A set of points, chosen from a given set of landmark points, all of which lie within at least one straight path of a given width

More precisely, a path of width w may be defined as the set of all points within a distance of w/2 of a straight line on a plane, or a great circle on a sphere, or in general any geodesic on any other kind of manifold.  Note that, in general, any given set of points that are aligned in this way will contain a large number of infinitesimally different straight paths.  Therefore, only the existence of at least one straight path is necessary to determine whether a set of points is an alignment. For this reason, it is easier to count the sets of points, rather than the paths themselves.
The number of alignments found is very sensitive to the allowed width w, increasing approximately proportionately to wk-2, where k is the number of points in an alignment.

The following is a very approximate order-of-magnitude estimate of the likelihood of alignments, assuming a plane covered with uniformly distributed "significant" points.

Consider a set of n points in a compact area with approximate diameter L and area approximately L2. Consider a valid line to be one where every point is within distance w/2 of the line (that is, lies on a track of width w, where w ≪ L).

Consider all the unordered sets of k points from the n points, of which there are:

(see factorial and binomial coefficient for notation).

To make a rough estimate of the probability that any given subset of k points is approximately collinear in the way defined above, consider the line between the "leftmost" and "rightmost" two points in that set (for some arbitrary left/right axis: we can choose top and bottom for the exceptional vertical case). These two points are by definition on this line. For each of the remaining k-2 points, the probability that the point is "near enough" to the line is roughly w/L, which can be seen by considering the ratio of the area of the line tolerance zone (roughly wL) and the overall area (roughly L2).

So, the expected number of k-point alignments, by this definition, is very roughly:

Among other things this can be used to show that, contrary to intuition, the number of k-point lines expected from random chance in a plane covered with points at a given density, for a given line width, increases much more than linearly with the size of the area considered, since the combinatorial explosion of growth in the number of possible combinations of points more than makes up for the increase in difficulty of any given combination lining up.

More precise estimate of expected number of alignments 

A more precise expression for the number of 3-point alignments of maximum width w and maximum length d expected by chance among n points placed randomly on a square of side L is 

If edge effects (alignments lost over the boundaries of the square) are included, then the expression becomes

A generalisation to k-point alignments (ignoring edge effects) is

which has roughly similar asymptotic scaling properties as the crude approximation in the previous section, with combinatorial explosion for large n overwhelming the effects of other variables.

Computer simulation of alignments 

Computer simulations show that points on a plane tend to form alignments similar to those found by ley hunters in numbers consistent with the order-of-magnitude estimates above, suggesting that ley lines may also be generated by chance. This phenomenon occurs regardless of whether the points are generated pseudo-randomly by computer, or from data sets of mundane features such as pizza restaurants or telephone booths.

It is easy to find alignments of 4 to 8 points in reasonably small data sets with w = 50 m.
Choosing large areas or larger values of w makes it easy to find alignments of 20 or more points.

See also 
 Apophenia
 Clustering illusion
 Coincidence
 Complete spatial randomness
 General position
 Pattern recognition
 Procrustes analysis
 Ramsey theory, for a notion of "unavoidable coincidences"
 Statistical shape analysis

References 

Euclidean geometry
Statistical randomness
Combinatorics
Computer vision
Astronomy
Spatial analysis